Khaleesi is a feminine given name derived from the Dothraki title meaning queen.

The title "Khaleesi" was earned by the A Song of Ice and Fire and Game of Thrones character Daenerys Targaryen, created by American author George R. R. Martin. Parents who chose the name for their daughters said they were attracted by the strength and beauty of the character, who liberated slaves and overcame obstacles to assume power in her own right. Pet owners also named their animals after the character. The dark turn taken by the character and her ultimate fate on the 2010s television series prompted discussion about whether parents would regret using the name for their daughters.

Usage
The name remains in regular use and, as of 2021, had been among the thousand most popular names in use for girls in the United States since 2014. It is also in use in other countries. Daenerys, the name of the character, is also in regular use.

References

English given names invented by fiction writers